Mark Mahoney (born 1957) is an American tattoo artist. He is considered as the founding father of black and grey art with a single needle.

Biography
Mark Mahoney grew up in Boston, Massachusetts. After a brief stint at the School of the Museum of Fine Arts, he became a tattoo artist.

He owns and is the principal artist at the Shamrock Social Club on Sunset Boulevard in Hollywood, Los Angeles, California.

He has tattooed the celebrity clients Kelly Osbourne, Lady Gaga, David Beckham, and Brooklyn Beckham.

Filmography

Feature films
 Blood Ties (2013)
 Black Mass (2015)

Television
 Unplanned America (2014; Season 2 Episode 4 "Marked Men")

Music videos
 Lana Del Rey - "West Coast" (2014)
 Lana Del Rey - "Shades of Cool" (2014)

References

Further reading

External links
 
 Mark Mahoney at Shamrock Social Club

Living people
1957 births
People from Massachusetts
American tattoo artists